Johann Heinrich Christfried Dau (1790–1831) was a Holstein-Danish geologist and writer, whose identification of peat layers led eventually to a system of classifying and dating post-glacial northern European paleoclimate periods, the Blytt–Sernander sequences based on peat stratigraphy.

He died at Altona, Hamburg in 1831.

Selected publications
Neues Handbuch über Torf, dessen Natur, Entstehung und Wiedererzeugung, Nutzen im Allgemeinen und für den Staat, Leipzig, 1823.
Allerunterthänigster Bericht an die Königliche Dänische Rentekammer über die Torfmoore Seelands nach einer im Herbste 1828 deshalb unternommenen Reise. Copenhagen and Leipzig, 1829.
 Om Retfærdighed og Frihed og deres nødvendige Samværen, især i politisk Henseende, Copenhagen,  1831.

Further reading
Axel Garboe, Geologiens historie i Danmark

Danish geologists
Dau Heinrich
1790 births
1831 deaths